Abdullah Atalar (born April 11, 1954) is a Turkish scientist and academic. Atalar was the Rector of İhsan Doğramacı Bilkent University, and a professor at Department of Electrical and Electronics Engineering. He received B.S. degree from Middle East Technical University, in 1974, M.S. and Ph.D. degrees from Stanford University in 1976 and 1978, respectively, all in Electrical Engineering. His thesis work was on reflection acoustic microscopy.

Atalar is a member of Turkish Academy of Sciences,. He was a member of Scientific and Technological Research Council (TÜBİTAK) science board (2004-2011),  and chairman of the board of directors of TUBITAK Space (2004-2007) and TUBITAK Ulakbim (2004-2012). He is the chairman of the board of directors of Bilkent Holding, the endowment company owned wholly by Bilkent University. He is a recipient of TUBITAK's science award (1994). He is a fellow of the IEEE.  He is married to Ayşe, granddaughter of İhsan Doğramacı, founder of İhsan Doğramacı Bilkent University.

References

External links
Official Web Page
"Abdullah Atalar", sozluk.sourtimes.org

Fellow Members of the IEEE
Turkish electrical engineers
1954 births
Living people
Stanford University School of Engineering alumni
Middle East Technical University alumni
Academic staff of Bilkent University
People from Gaziantep
Rectors of universities and colleges in Turkey
Recipients of TÜBİTAK Science Award
Turkish expatriates in the United States
Microwave engineers
Electrical engineering academics